The term "chancery hand" can refer to either of two distinct styles of historical handwriting.

A chancery hand was at first a form of handwriting for business transactions that developed in the Lateran chancery (the ) of the 13th century, then spread to France, notably through the Avignon Papacy, and to England after 1350. This early "chancery hand" is a form of blackletter. Versions of it were adopted by royal and ducal chanceries, which were often staffed by clerics who had taken minor orders.

A later cursive "chancery hand", also developed in the Vatican but based on humanist minuscule (itself based on Carolingian minuscule), was introduced in the 1420s by Niccolò Niccoli; it was the manuscript origin of the typefaces we recognize as italic.

Blackletter chancery

English chancery hand 
In medieval England each of the royal departments tended to develop its own characteristic hand: the chancery hand used in the royal chancery at Westminster from the mid-century was employed for writs, enrolments, patents, and engrossing of royal letters; its use continued for the enrollment of acts of Parliament until 1836.

The English chancery hand was already an arcane speciality by the time of the Restoration. Samuel Pepys recorded (Thursday 12 July 1660):

Cursive chancery hand

The later  ("cursive chancery hand"), often called "Chancery Cursive", developed from Humanist minuscule, itself the progeny of Carolingian minuscule, in the mid-15th century as "a cursive form of the humanistic minuscule". In England and France at the time it was known as Italic. The Italian scribe Ludovico Vicentino degli Arrighi's 1522 influential pamphlet on handwriting called  was the first book on writing the italic script known as cursive chancery hand. He was a scribe in the Papal Curia, which had refined cursive chancery hand in its infancy during the latter half of the 15th century. While considered a cursive, this "papal hand" was "strongly disciplined in form, regular in movement and slightly, if at all, inclined from the perpendicular."

In cursive chancery hand the pen was held slanted at a 45° angle for speed, but it could also produce beautiful calligraphic writing. In 15th-century Italy the cursive chancery hand was employed in correspondence, everyday business, and documents of minor formal importance.

It was adapted as the model for the italic typeface developed by Aldus Manutius in Venice, from punches cut by Francesco Griffo and first used in 1500 for the small portable series of inexpensive classics that issued from the Aldine press.

In 16th-century England it became known as the "Italian hand" to distinguish it from the angular, cramped, Blackletter-derived English chancery hand which had been developed earlier and independently.

See also

Asemic writing
Bastarda
Blackletter
Wilfrid Jasper Walter Blunt
Book hand
Calligraphy
Court hand (also known as common law hand, Anglicana, cursiva antiquior, or charter hand)
Cursive
Hand (writing style)
Handwriting
History of writing
Italic script
Law hand
Palaeography
Penmanship
Ronde script (calligraphy)
Rotunda (script)
Round hand
Secretary hand
Zapfino, a digital typeface that simulates an italic chancery hand, designed by Hermann Zapf

Citations

References
Medieval writing: 15th century English chancery hand
Medieval writing: 16th century English chancery hand
Palaeography: Historical Notes
A. S. Osley, Scribes and Sources: Handbook of Chancery Hand in the Sixteenth Century (Boston: Godine, 1980), . Facsimile selections from a range of continental and English writing masters.
Encyclopædia Britannica
List of online resources for early modern English paleography
 Palaeography: reading old handwriting 1500 - 1800 A practical online tutorial

Further reading 
 
 

Writing
Latin-script calligraphy
Medieval scripts
Western calligraphy